Krásna Ves is a village and municipality in Bánovce nad Bebravou District in the Trenčín Region of north-western Slovakia.

History
In historical records the village was first mentioned in 1208.

Geography
The municipality lies at an altitude of 250 metres and covers an area of 10.216 km². It has a population of about 510 people. It lies at the southwest foot of the Strážov Mountains, on the upper part of the Bebrava river.

Other information
Car Codes : BN
Post Code : 956 53
Calling Code : 00 421 38

References

External links 
Official website
https://web.archive.org/web/20080111223415/http://www.statistics.sk/mosmis/eng/run.html

Villages and municipalities in Bánovce nad Bebravou District